Hwang Ahhyeon (born 12 November 2001) is a South Korean professional footballer who plays as a forward for WE League club INAC Kobe Leonessa.

References

2001 births
Living people
South Korean women's footballers
Women's association football forwards
INAC Kobe Leonessa players
WE League players
South Korean expatriate footballers
South Korean expatriate sportspeople in Japan
Expatriate women's footballers in Japan